(385343) 2002 LV, provisional designation , is a stony asteroid on a highly eccentric orbit, classified as near-Earth object and potentially hazardous asteroid of the Apollo group, approximately  in diameter. It was discovered on 1 June 2002, by astronomers with the Lincoln Near-Earth Asteroid Research at the Lincoln Laboratory's Experimental Test Site near Socorro, New Mexico, in the United States. The Sr-type asteroid has a rotation period of 6.2 hours and is likely elongated.

Orbit and classification 

 is a member of the Earth-crossing group of Apollo asteroids, the largest group of near-Earth objects with approximately 10 thousand known members.

It orbits the Sun at a distance of 0.9–3.7 AU once every 3 years and 6 months (1,286 days; semi-major axis of 2.31 AU). Its orbit has an eccentricity of 0.61 and an inclination of 30° with respect to the ecliptic. Due to its large aphelion, it also crosses the orbit of Mars at 1.66 AU. The body's observation arc begins with its official discovery observation at Socorro in June 2002.

Close approaches 

Its closest near-Earth encounter is predicted to occur on 4 August 2076 at a distance of  only (see table).

Physical characteristics 

Observations with the Spitzer Space Telescope characterized this object as an Sr-subtype that transitions from the common, stony S-type asteroids to the uncommon R-types.

Rotation period 

In July 2002, a rotational lightcurve of this asteroid was obtained from photometric observations by Petr Pravec at Ondřejov Observatory in the Czech Republic. Lightcurve analysis gave a well-defined rotation period of 6.195 hours with a high brightness amplitude of 0.93 magnitude, indicative for an elongated, non-spherical shape. The result agrees with a period of 6.2 hours measured at the Table Mountain Observatory and at the CS3-Palmer Divide Station  in 2009 and 2016, respectively.

Diameter and albedo 

According to post-cryogenic observations with the Spitzer Telescope during the ExploreNEOs survey, and observations carried out by the NEOWISE mission of NASA's Wide-field Infrared Survey Explorer, this asteroid measures between 1.359 and 1.73 kilometers in diameter and its surface has an albedo between 0.15 and 0.2158. The Collaborative Asteroid Lightcurve Link assumes a stony standard albedo of 0.20 and calculates a diameter of 1.42 kilometers based on an absolute magnitude of 16.6.

Numbering and naming 

This minor planet was numbered by the Minor Planet Center on 14 February 2014. As of 2018, it has not been named.

Notes

References

External links 
 List of the Potentially Hazardous Asteroids (PHAs), Minor Planet Center
 PHA Close Approaches To The Earth, Minor Planet Center
 Asteroid Lightcurve Database (LCDB), query form (info )
 
 
 

385343
385343
385343
20020601